Thottea siliquosa is a species of flowering plant in the family Aristolochiaceae. It is used as an Ayurvedic medicine in India and Sri Lanka.

References

External links
 
 India biodiversity

Aristolochiaceae